Abriès-Ristolas is a commune in the Hautes-Alpes department in southeastern France. The municipality was established on 1 January 2019 by merger of the former communes of Abriès and Ristolas.

References

Communes of Hautes-Alpes
Communes nouvelles of Hautes-Alpes
2019 establishments in France
Populated places established in 2019
Dauphiné